Jeremy Rashaad Lane (born July 14, 1990) is a former American football cornerback. He played college football at Northwestern State University of Louisiana and was drafted by the Seattle Seahawks in the sixth round of the 2012 NFL Draft. He became a member of the Legion of Boom, and was part of Seattle's Super Bowl XLVIII-winning team over the Denver Broncos.

Professional career

Seattle Seahawks 
On April 28, 2012, Lane was drafted by the Seattle Seahawks with the 172nd pick overall in the sixth round of the 2012 NFL Draft. On May 7, 2012, he agreed to contract terms. During the 2013 NFL season, Lane won his first Super Bowl ring as a member of the Seahawks. In Super Bowl XLVIII, the Seahawks defeated the Denver Broncos by a score of 43–8. Lane suffered a groin injury in Week 1 of the 2014 season against the Green Bay Packers.

Lane recorded his first career interception in Super Bowl XLIX, picking off quarterback Tom Brady on a pass at the goal-line in the first quarter. The play proved costly as on the interception return, Lane suffered a severe arm injury and a torn ACL after being tackled by Julian Edelman during the return of the interception; he did not return to the game which they later lost 28–24 to the Patriots.

After missing the first 11 weeks of the 2015 season, Lane returned to the Seahawks in their Week 12 victory over the Pittsburgh Steelers. Lane recorded an interception in his first quarter, picking off backup quarterback Landry Jones on a fake field goal attempt.

On March 9, 2016, Lane re-signed with the Seahawks on a four-year contract.

On September 10, 2017, Lane was ejected from the Seahawks season opener against the Green Bay Packers during the first quarter in an incident with wide receiver Davante Adams.

On October 30, 2017, Lane was traded along with two draft picks (a 2018 fifth-rounder and a 2019 second-rounder) to the Houston Texans for offensive tackle Duane Brown. However, the following day, it was reported Lane had failed his physical and would no longer be part of the trade, and instead the Seahawks would send a third-rounder in 2018 (Martinas Rankin) and second-rounder in 2019 in exchange for Brown and a 2018 fifth round pick.

On March 9, 2018, Lane was released by the Seahawks, along with fellow cornerback Richard Sherman.

On July 25, 2019, he signed with the SoCal Coyotes, a professional developmental football program in Palm Springs, California, to "keep himself game-ready" for future NFL opportunities.

References

External links 
Seattle Seahawks Player Page – Jeremy Lane

1990 births
Living people
American football cornerbacks
Northwestern State Demons football players
Players of American football from Texas
Seattle Seahawks players
Sportspeople from Tyler, Texas